Mojo , in the African-American spiritual practice called Hoodoo, is an amulet consisting of a flannel bag containing one or more magical items. It is a "prayer in a bag", or a spell that can be carried with or on the host's body. Alternative American names for the mojo bag include gris-gris bag, hand, mojo hand, conjure hand, lucky hand, conjure bag, trick bag, tricken bag, root bag, toby and jomo. The making of mojo bags in Hoodoo is a system of African-American occult magic. The creation of mojo bags is an esoteric system that involves sometimes housing spirits inside of bags for either protection, healing, or harm and to consult with spirits. Other times mojo bags are created to manifest results in a person's life such as good-luck, money or love.

History and ideology 

Central and West Africans all practiced the spiritual art of creating conjure bags for protection, healing and to communicate with spirits. The gris-gris originated in Dagomba in Ghana and was associated with Islamic traditions. Originally the gris-gris was adorned with Islamic scripture and was used to ward off evil spirits (evil djinn) or bad luck. Historians of the time noted that they were frequently worn by non-believers and believers alike, and were also found attached to buildings. The practice of using gris-gris, though originating in Africa, came to the United States with enslaved Africans and was quickly adopted by practitioners of Louisiana Voodoo and Hoodoo in the United States, and Vodou in Haiti. During the Trans-Atlantic slave trade, a few enslaved Africans were able to conceal their conjure bags when they boarded slave ships heading to the Americas. For example, Gullah Jack was an African from Angola who carried a conjure bag (mojo bag) onto a slave ship leaving Zanzibar for the United States. Gullah Jack was known to carry a conjure bag with him at all times for his spiritual protection. The Mandingo (Mandinka) were the first Muslim ethnic group imported from Sierra Leone in West Africa to the Americas. Mandingo people were known for their powerful conjure bags called gris-gris (later called mojo bags in the United States). Some of the Mandingo people were able to carry their gris-gris bags with them when they boarded slave ships heading to the Americas bringing the practice to the United States. Enslaved people went to enslaved black Muslims for conjure services requesting them to make gris-gris bags (mojo bags) for protection against their enslavers. In West-Central Africa, Bakongo and Yoruba people created medicine bags using leather or cloth and placed feathers, animal parts, roots, herbs and other ingredients for protection. When Yoruba and Bakongo people were enslaved in the United States, the practice of using feathers, animal parts, animal and human bones, and other ingredients to create mojo bags continued in African-American communities in the tradition of Hoodoo. In West-Central Africa, people wear nkisi, wanga, and other charm bags to ward from and reverse evil and to cure illness. In West Africa these conjure bags are called Juju. The word Juju is used in the African Diaspora to describe all forms of charms made in Hoodoo, African Diaspora Religions and African Traditional Religions. These African ideals about charm bags influenced the creation of mojo bags and the spiritual philosophical practice in African-American communities. Mojo bags can be hung from trees, tied to a string, worn underneath the clothes to cause an effect on the target.

There is also a Central African influence of the mojo bag in African-American Hoodoo. For example, the minkisi and nkisi are spirit containers made by hand from a root doctor. These spirits are contained in a bag, gourd, shells and other containers. The Bakongo people's Nkisi Nkubulu looks similar to the mojo bags in Hoodoo. The spiritual philosophy of the mojo bag also has Bakongo influence. For example, in Bakongo belief simbi spirits can inhabit conjure bags (mojo bags) for healing or protecting an individual or a community. The Nganga creates the bag for the individual using ingredients specific to a certain simbi to invoke it into the conjure bag. Bakongo spiritual philosophy influenced the creation of mojo bags as African-Americans include certain natural and animal ingredients such as animal bones, animal teeth, claws, human bones or graveyard dirt to house a simbi spirit or an ancestral spirit inside a bag for either protection or healing. However, the practice became African-American when blacks in America used American materials and reinterpreted them applying a Christian or Islamic interpretation with Bakongo cosmogram concepts.

Archeologists in New York discovered continued West-Central African burial practices in a section of Lower Manhattan, New York City which is now the location of the African Burial Ground National Monument. Historians and archeologists found Kongo related artifacts at the African Burial Ground such as minkisi and nkisi conjure bundles buried with African remains. These nkisi and minkisi bundles became the conjure bags in Hoodoo.

At Hermitage plantation in Nashville, Tennessee, archeologists discovered continued West African traditions of using hexagonal glass beads for fertility and other spiritual purposes. Other charms found were mojo hands, lucky roots, raccoon penis bones, ceramics, and blue beads. These items found in a slave cabin showed enslaved African-Americans used local roots and created mojo hands for protection and healing. Enslaved African-Americans at Hermitage plantation used prehistoric artifacts for charms to draw spiritual power from ancient artifacts. In addition, archeologists found Kongo cosmograms engraved onto lime stone marbles for spiritual power.

According to scholars, the origin of the word Hoodoo and other words associated with the practice were traced to the Bight of Benin and Senegambia. For example, in West Africa the word gris-gris (a conjure bag) is a Mande word. The word wanga (another word for mojo bag) comes from the Kikongo language. The word mojo comes from the West African word mojuba. The most common synonym for the word mojo is gris-gris, which literally means "fetish" or "charm"; thus a gris-gris bag is a charm bag. In the Caribbean, an almost identical African-derived bag is called a wanga or oanga bag, but that term is uncommon in the United States. The word conjure is an ancient alternative to "hoodoo", which is a direct variation of African-American folklore. Because of this, a conjure hand is also considered a hoodoo bag, usually made by a respected community conjure doctor. The word mojo also originated from the Kikongo word mooyo. The word mooyo means that natural ingredients have their own indwelling spirit that can be utilized in mojo bags to bring luck and protection.

The word hand in this context is defined as a combination of ingredients. The term may derive from the use of finger and hand bones from the dead in mojo bags, or from ingredients such as the lucky hand root (favored by gamblers). The latter suggests an analogy between the varied bag ingredients and the several cards that make up a hand in card games. Mojo reaches as far back as West African culture, where it is said to drive away evil spirits, keep good luck in the household, manipulate a fortune, and lure and persuade lovers. The ideology of the ancestors and the descendants of the mojo hand used this "prayer in a bag" based on their belief of spiritual inheritance, by which the omniscient forefathers of their families would provide protection and favor, especially when they used the mojo. Through this, a strong belief was placed in the idealism of whoever used mojo, creating a spiritual trust in the magic itself.

Making a mojo 

Most Southern-style conjure bags are made of red flannel material. The use of red flannel bags for mojo bags was influenced by the Bakongo people's minkisi in Central Africa, and in Hoodoo red symbolizes protection from evil and spiritual power. Other times when red cloth was not available, African Americans used whatever cloth they had to create a conjure bag. The contents of each bag vary directly with the aim of the conjurer. For example, a mojo carried for love-drawing will contain different ingredients than one for gambling luck or magical protection. Ingredients can include graveyard dirt, roots, herbs, animal parts, minerals, coins, crystals, good luck tokens, and carved amulets. The more personalized objects are used to add extra power because of their symbolic value. A former slave from Texas said to make a conjure bag African-Americans "would take hair and brass nails and thimbles and needles and mix them up in a conjure bag." Prince Johnson a former slave from Mississippi said his slaveholder would inspect her slaves to make sure they did not have any charms underneath their clothes. Some mojo bags were made to cause harm and bad luck for slaveholders, and other mojo bags were for protection depending on the ingredients used by the root worker. William Webb made mojo bags for enslaved people in Kentucky to keep the peace between the enslaved and their enslavers. Webb instructed the enslaved to gather roots from their local environment and place them in conjure bags and pray over them to keep the spiritual magic of the mojo bags active. During slavery, there are records of African American ministers and church members in Black churches in Virginia and South Carolina were known by the members of their congregation and in the slave community to conjure spirits, speak to the spirits of the dead and carry and make mojo bags. After the American Civil War, some African American ministers and church members continued to rely on Hoodoo and make mojo bags and saw no contradiction in their practice with Christianity. One African American church minister relied on a conjurer to make him a mojo bag to attract more members to his church. For four years the minister relied on the mojo bag to increase the membership of his church. Every Sunday the church pews were filled. After four years the minister did not feel comfortable depending on the spirit of a mojo bag and not the Christian God to grow his church. The minister threw away the mojo bag and when he did people stopped coming to his church. These written accounts showed that African Americans who identified as Christian continued to believe and practice African spirituality and some African American Christians relied on Hoodoo when experiencing tough times in life. Some African-Americans made money making and selling mojo bags as a full-time business. Dr. Jim Jordan was a conjure doctor in North Carolina and became a multi-millionaire by providing conjure services to people all over the United States during the Jim Crow era. He owned a conjure Hoodoo store and provided medicinal and spiritual healing to his clients using charms and herbal remedies.

Another version of a mojo bag is a prayer cloth. Prayer cloths are white church cloths imbued with spiritual power from a pastor of a church. A pastor prays over the cloth speaking the power of God into the cloth with prayer and anointing of Holy Oil and functions like a mojo bag. Church members take prayer cloths with them in their purses or placed under their beds for protection. This modified version of a mojo bag is mostly found in African-American churches.

The creation of mojo bags in Hoodoo is a West and Central African practice brought to the United States by enslaved Africans. In Africa, petition papers with Quranic verses along with herbs, roots and other ingredients are placed inside a leather bag and concealed by wearing them under the clothes. A few enslaved Africans brought their conjure bags (mojo bags) with them from Africa when they boarded slave ships heading to North America. African-American quilt makers sewed mojo hands into quilts for protection. This practice originates among West African people as they sewed Adinkra and Nsibidi symbols as protective charms into their fabrics. The Ejagham women of Cameroon and Yoruba women in Nigeria make cloths with sacred symbols on them. During the Trans-Atlantic slave trade, many West African people were taken to the United States and enslaved on plantations and continued to practice their traditions by sewing mojo hands into their quilts.

On slave plantations in the United States, the creators of gris-gris (mojos) became the root workers, conjure doctors, and Hoodoo doctors in enslaved and free African American communities. Enslaved and free black root workers created mojo bags and placed Bible verses, petition papers, roots, herbs, animal parts, graveyard dirt, and other ingredients to conjure a negative or positive effect. They used either Christian or Islamic prayers to spirituality charge the mojo bag. During slavery, many of the mojo bags created were for protection against a harsh slaveholder. The petition papers placed inside a mojo bag can have either a Bible verse, a Quranic verse, symbols, and other characters to conjure a positive or negative magical result. In the United States, enslaved African Americans called mojo bags "voodoo bags." After the Civil War, mojo bags were created in Black American communities for protection from law enforcement, to attract love, protection, money, employment, or to communicate with spirits. Folklorist Newbell Niles Puckett documented a mojo practice of an African-American cook in the Mississippi Delta. The African-American cook had a mojo bag with a "lizard's tail, rabbit's foot, a fish eye, snake skins, a beetle, and a dime with a hole in it." This mojo bag was worn by the cook for good-luck. Other conjure bundles in the hoodoo tradition are hanged on the side of the door or beds where people sleep to protect from conjure.

Traditionally, a client consulted with a root worker to know what kind of mojo he or she needed as not all mojos are the same, as one mojo can not work for everyone. Each person needs a different mojo. In traditional Hoodoo, if there are several people needing love, the root worker or conjurer created different mojos for each of their clients. One mojo created the same can not work for everyone. By the twentieth century, Hoodoo was culturally appropriated by outsiders to African-American culture to make a profit. Spiritual shops began to sell the same mojo for everyone. In traditional Hoodoo, certain songs, prayers, symbols, and ingredients are used to conjure or manifest results. However, when Hoodoo was appropriated by white spiritual merchants, the same mojo was sold to consumers.

Maintenance

Fixing and feeding a mojo hand 
There is a process to fixing a proper mojo. A ritual must be put in place in order to successfully prepare a mojo by being filled and awakened to life. This can be done by smoking incense and candles, or it may be breathed upon to bring it to life. Prayers may be said, and other methods may be used to accomplish this essential step. Once prepared, the mojo is "dressed" or "fed" with a liquid such as alcohol (whiskey, rum) perfume, water, or bodily fluids. The reason it is said to feed the mojo to keep it working is that it is alive with spirit. One story from the work entitled From My People describes a slave who went out and sought a mojo conjurer that gave him a mojo to run away from home. The story describes the slave's mojo as fixing him into many formations, and he ultimately dies because he misuses its power. Had he fixed and believed in the specific mojo himself, he might have escaped the plantation alive.

Hiding the mojo 
Mojos are traditionally made for an individual and so must be concealed on the person at all times. Men usually keep the trinkets hidden in the pants pocket, while women are more prone to clip it to the bra. They are also commonly pinned to clothes below the waist. Depending on the type of mojo, the hiding place will be crucial to its success, as those who make conjure bags to carry love spells sometimes specify that the mojo must be worn next to the skin. A story from the book From My People described the story of Moses and the task he went through to bring his people out of slavery. It described how "Hoodoo Lost his Hand", as Moses's mojo was hidden through his staff. When he turned it into a snake, the pharaoh made his soothsayers and magicians create the same effect. As a result, the Pharaoh's snake was killed by Moses's snake, and that is how Hoodoo lost his hand.

Mojo bags in blues music 
Blues is a genre of music created in the United States by African Americans in the mid-nineteenth century that incorporates spirituals, African American work songs, slave shout songs, field hollers and call-and-response. Several blues singers created songs about mojo bags. For example, the Preston “Red” Foster song Got My Mojo Working, recorded by Ann Cole in 1956 and by Muddy Waters the following year, spoke about the spiritual power of the mojo bag. Junior Wells composed an album in 1965 called Hoodoo Man Blues. In the song, Wells explained he traveled to Louisiana and saw a Hoodoo practitioner to make him a mojo bag to get back his girlfriend who left him for another man.

Slave narratives 
In the 1930s, the Federal Writers' Project part of the Works Progress Administration during the Great Depression, provided jobs for unemployed writers to write and collect the experiences of former slaves. Writers, black and white, documented the experiences of the last generation of African Americans born into slavery. Former African American slaves told writers about their slave experience which provided readers a glimpse into the lives of the enslaved. Slave narratives revealed the culture of African Americans during slavery. African American former slaves talked about conjure, rootwork, and Hoodoo. These narratives revealed how enslaved African-Americans made mojo bags for protection against their enslavers and conjure. The Library of Congress has 2,300 first-person accounts from former slaves in their digital archive.

See also
 Auntie Caroline
 Medicine bag
 Nkisi Nkondi
 Omamori
 Sacred bundle
 Witch bottle

References

 

Hoodoo (spirituality)
African-American cultural history
American folklore
Amulets
Talismans